The black-browed bushtit or black-browed tit (Aegithalos bonvaloti) is a species of bird in the family Aegithalidae. It is found in mid-southern China and sporadically in Myanmar. Its natural habitats are boreal forests and temperate forests. It was formerly considered conspecific with the rufous-fronted tit (A. iouschistos) of the central and eastern Himalayas but is now often regarded as a separate species. Sometimes the subspecies A. b. sharpei (Burmese tit) of western Burma is also treated as a species.

It has grey upperparts, rufous breast and flanks and a white belly. The head is buff with a broad black mask, white forehead and a white bib, speckled black in the centre. The Burmese tit has white rather than buff on the head, a dark breastband and a buff belly.

References

MacKinnon, John & Karen Phillipps (2000) A Field Guide to the Birds of China, Oxford University Press, Oxford
Robson, Craig (2002) A Field Guide to the Birds of South-East Asia, New Holland Publishers (UK) Ltd., London

black-browed bushtit
Birds of China
Birds of Yunnan
black-browed bushtit
black-browed bushtit
Taxonomy articles created by Polbot